Georg Adolf Suckow, 1800–1801. 

 François Marie Daudin . (F.M. Daudin, ed.). , Paris, France
 Johann Conrad Susemihl began a 22 part work on the birds of Germany, "" completed in 1817.
 Jacques Labillardière published the very popular Relation du Voyage à la Recherche de la Pérouse.
 Death of Johann Hermann
 Death of Jean-Baptiste Audebert
 Death of François-Nicolas Martinet
 Jean Baptiste Leschenault de la Tour sailed from France as a naturalist on Nicolas Baudin's expedition to Australia. In April 1803 he fell  ill and  had to be put ashore at Timor. He spent the next three years on Java returning to  France in July 1807 with a large collection of plants and birds.

Birding and ornithology by year
1800 in science